Dan Kennedy (Irish: Dónall Ó Cinnéide) was an Irish sportsperson who played hurling with the Kilkenny senior team.  In a senior inter-county career that lasted from 1905 until 1917, he won six All-Ireland titles and three Leinster titles. Kennedy began his sporting career playing for local club Tullaroan.

References

Teams

Year of birth missing
Year of death missing
Place of birth missing
Kilkenny inter-county hurlers
All-Ireland Senior Hurling Championship winners
Tullaroan hurlers
Irish hurlers
20th-century Irish people